Jabal al-Tair Island (or Jebel Teir, Jabal al-Tayr, Tair Island, Al-Tair Island, Jazirat at-Tair) ( Jazīrat Jabal aṭ-Ṭayr, 'Bird Mountain Island') is a roughly oval volcanic island in Yemen, northwest of the constricted Bab al-Mandab passage at the mouth of the Red Sea, about halfway between mainland Yemen and Eritrea. From 1996 until an eruption in 2007, Yemen maintained two watchtowers and a small military base on the island.

After 124 years of dormancy, the volcano that created the island erupted on 30 September 2007.

Geography

The volcano was wrongly considered "recently extinct" by 1982.
It was the northernmost known Holocene volcano in the Red Sea, with one central vent, Jebel Duchan.  It lies in the volcanic and geologically active region of the Red Sea Rift, the divergent boundary between the African Plate and the Arabian Plate.

The prominent profile made it an ideal landmark for Red Sea shipping, and the steep drop-off below sea level meant that it might be safely run for.
The island has no settled population, but some parts of the island have allowed for the seasonal presence of fishermen.

History
In the past, the island, formerly known as Saiban,
was an important navigational marker for the shipping lanes that passed nearby.  Historically, the Ottoman Empire controlled the Red Sea islands, and granted a French company a lighthouse concession. British forces occupied the island in 1915, but sovereignty was deliberately left indeterminate. After a period of French-British operation the lighthouse concession passed to a British company, then to Yemen. 
 
Sovereignty of the island was long disputed among Ethiopia, Eritrea, and Yemen. Under a 1962 agreement, lighthouses were maintained on the island at the cost of shippers. In 1973, Yemen had notified Ethiopia of its intent to perform an aerial survey, and an ambiguous response by Ethiopia was later a point of contention; Ethiopia designated the islands in the area as having "no recognized owner".
The dispute, after Eritrea's 1993 independence from Ethiopia, erupted into the 1995 Hanish islands crisis regarding the Hanish Islands and Zuqar Island.
A 1998-99 international case at the Permanent Court of Arbitration awarded various islands to Eritrea and Yemen respectively.

Yemen maintained a military base on the island from the dispute with Eritrea in 1996 until the 2007 eruption. There are or were two watchtowers for control and observation of the large warships, cargo ships, and oil tankers that pass by.

2007 eruption

The volcano erupted at 7 p.m. local time on 30 September 2007, throwing lava and ash hundreds of meters into the air.  Subsequently, at least one stream of lava was seen flowing down into the sea.  It was reported that 29 Yemeni soldiers (around 50 according to one report) were evacuated from the island shortly before the eruption, but 8 were unaccounted for. Several bodies were recovered from the water.
It was reported that the western part of the island, where the Yemeni military base was, had collapsed.

Yemeni authorities requested help from a nearby NATO naval force, and the nearest ship, a United States Naval vessel USS Bainbridge, was reported to be aiding the Yemeni coastguard.
Other ships from NATO Standing NRF Maritime Group 1 assisted in the rescue and recovery effort, including HMCS Toronto; the Bainbridge and Toronto each rescued one survivor. The Portuguese frigate NRP Álvares Cabral and the Dutch frigate HNLMS Evertsen were first on the scene.
Both survivors were rescued after over 20 hours in the water, just as the task force was preparing to close down its search. A Canadian officer described a "spectacular backdrop of erupting lava and shooting flames" faced by search parties in small boats.

Several minor earthquakes ranging from 2 to 3.6 on the moment magnitude scale were reported near the island in the two weeks before the eruption.

Earlier documented eruptions of this volcano include several reported in the 18th and 19th centuries, the most recent (before 2007) in 1883, and possibly one in 1332.
A Yemeni government geologist expects the volcano to "take time to calm down",
but shipping, including tankers carrying 3 million barrels of oil, that pass through the Red Sea daily, have not been affected.
In December 2007 it was reported that activity on the island had increased and fishermen were warned to avoid the area.

References

External links
Google Earth view
Global Volcanism Program

Active volcanoes
Islands of the Red Sea
Islands of Yemen
Holocene stratovolcanoes
Volcanoes of Yemen
Territorial disputes of Yemen
Territorial disputes of Ethiopia
Territorial disputes of Eritrea
Disputed islands
Permanent Court of Arbitration cases
Eritrea–Yemen relations